Colum McKinstry (1949 – 8 August 2021) was a Gaelic football manager and player. At club level he played with Clan na Gael and also played at senior level for the Armagh county team throughout the 1970s and 1980s. He usually lined out at midfield.

Career
McKinstry had several successes with the Lurgan-based club Clan na Gael who he represented at senior level between 1967 and 1985. The side won three Ulster Club Championship titles in that period, while he was also on the side that lost the 1974 All-Ireland club final to University College Dublin.

McKinstry joined the Armagh senior football team in 1968 and made his debut in a pre-season tournament involving Armagh, Antrim, Dublin and Sligo. He subsequently established himself on the team where he collected three Ulster Championships, including one as captain of the side in 1982. McKinstry also lined out at midfield in the 1977 All-Ireland final defeat by Dublin. He received an All-Star Award in 1980 and also represented Ulster in the Railway Cup.

McKinstry turned to management after his retirement from playing, beginning with his home club of Clan na Gael. He also had spells in managing the Middletown and Tullysaran.

Death
McKinstry died suddenly at his home on 8 August 2021, aged 71.

Honours
Clan na Gael
Ulster Senior Club Football Championship: 1972, 1973, 1974
Armagh Senior Football Championship: 1968, 1969, 1971, 1972, 1973, 1974, 1976, 1980, 1981

Armagh
Ulster Senior Football Championship: 1977, 1980, 1982 (c)

References

1949 births
2021 deaths
Armagh inter-county Gaelic footballers
Clan na Gael CLG Gaelic footballers
Gaelic football managers
Ulster inter-provincial Gaelic footballers